The Thomas's pygmy mouse (Mus sorella) is a species of rodent in the family Muridae.
It is found in Angola, Cameroon, Republic of the Congo, Democratic Republic of the Congo, Gabon, Kenya, Rwanda, South Sudan, Tanzania, and Uganda.
Its natural habitats are subtropical or tropical moist lowland forest, subtropical or tropical moist montane forest, and dry savanna.

References

Mus (rodent)
Mammals described in 1909
Taxa named by Oldfield Thomas
Taxonomy articles created by Polbot